Johan Georg Lillienberg (1713 – 26 April 1798) was a Swedish count and politician who was appointed as Lawspeaker of Gotland in 1746. In 1749, he became Governor of Åbo and Björneborg, and in 1757 Governor of Uppsala County. Lillienberg was made a baron in 1766 and a count in 1778.

In 1768, Lillienberg was elected a member of the Royal Swedish Academy of Sciences.

He died at his manor Herresta in Södermanland.

1713 births
1798 deaths
Swedish nobility
Members of the Royal Swedish Academy of Sciences
Governors of Uppsala County